Dudley Lake is located in Grand Teton National Park, in the US state of Wyoming.

Description
Dudley Lake was originally named Hanging Lake, and was renamed in honor of Dudley Hayden, an early park ranger. Access to the lake involves bushwacking up into Snowshoe Canyon and is apparently easier if one passes the main stream draining from the lake and instead ascends from Moran Creek from the northwest.

History
The lake was discovered in 1932 by park ranger Dudley Hayden. Following his death in 1969, the Jackson Hole Historical Society passed a resolution to rename Hanging Lake to Dudley Lake in his honor. Support for the name change came from then Governor Stan Hathaway, US Senators Gale McGee and Clifford Hansen, and US Congressman John S. Wold. The lake was officially renamed Dudley Lake by the Department of the Interior in 1970.

References

Lakes of Grand Teton National Park